Walter Moyano (born 26 December 1933) is a former Uruguayan cyclist. He competed in the individual and team road race events at the 1956 Summer Olympics.

References

1933 births
Living people
Uruguayan male cyclists
Olympic cyclists of Uruguay
Cyclists at the 1956 Summer Olympics
Place of birth missing (living people)